Ellsworth C. Dougherty (July 21, 1921 – 1965) was a biologist who was first to study the nematode worm Caenorhabditis elegans in the laboratory, with Victor Nigon, in the 1940s. He did most of his studies and medical work in California.

Tributes 
Mount Dougherty is a mountain range in Antarctica named after Ellsworth Dougherty.

The specific epithet given to the nematode species Caenorhabditis doughertyi is also a tribute to E. Dougherty.

See also 
 History of research on Caenorhabditis elegans

References 

1921 births
1965 deaths
20th-century American biologists
Caenorhabditis elegans
20th-century American zoologists